CJCO-DT (channel 38) is a multicultural television station in Calgary, Alberta, Canada, part of the Omni Television network. It is owned and operated by Rogers Sports & Media alongside Citytv station CKAL-DT (channel 5). Both stations share studios at 7 Avenue and 5 Street Southwest in Downtown Calgary, while CJCO-DT's transmitter is located near Old Banff Coach Road/Highway 563.

Overview

The station was licensed by the Canadian Radio-television and Telecommunications Commission (CRTC) on June 8, 2007, and it launched on September 15, 2008. The station was originally assigned the call sign CHXC by Industry Canada, but this was changed to CJCO in February 2008.

The station's primary focus is multicultural programming and documentaries. Like the other Omni stations across the country, the station once aired a large amount of syndicated American shows such as The Simpsons and The King of Queens, but those have since been dropped as of the start of the 2015–16 season.

Newscasts

Omni Alberta formerly produced local newscasts aimed at the Cantonese, Mandarin, and South Asian communities across the province. While there were newsgathering teams in both Edmonton and Calgary, the production of the newscasts themselves were done out of CKEM's studios in Downtown Edmonton. The newscasts were discontinued and replaced by Omni's national newscasts in September 2011; the national newscasts still featured contributions from Calgary-based reporters.

On May 30, 2013, Rogers announced that it would immediately close down the production facilities for both Omni Alberta stations as a result of budget cuts—ending the production of local programming and news content from the stations.

Technical information

Subchannel

As of July 28, 2020, due to the DTV spectrum repack happening across North America, CJCO-DT has moved from UHF 38 to UHF 34. The PSIP number remains as 38.1.

Analogue-to-digital conversion

On August 11, 2011, three weeks before Canadian television stations in CRTC-designated mandatory markets transitioned from analogue to digital broadcasts, CJCO shut down its analog transmitter and flash cut its digital signal into operation on UHF channel 38. Through the use of PSIP, digital television receivers will display CJCO-TV's virtual channel as 38.1.

References

External links

CJCO-DT history – Canadian Communication Foundation

JCO-DT
JCO-DT
Television channels and stations established in 2008
2008 establishments in Alberta